Blagovest Hristov Sendov (8 February 1932 – 19 January 2020) was a Bulgarian mathematician, diplomat and politician.

Early life and education
Sendov was born in Asenovgrad, Bulgaria.

Career

Academic
Sendov was the rector of Sofia University, located in Sofia, Bulgaria; and the Chairman of Bulgarian Academy of Sciences, also located in Sofia. He had more than 200 publications in fields related to mathematics and computer science.

Post-1989 political career

Sendov took part as an independent in the 1992 Bulgarian presidential election with Ognyan Saparev as his running mate, finishing in 4th place with 2.24% of the votes.

National Assembly of Bulgaria
From 1995 to 1997, he was the Chairperson of the National Assembly of Bulgaria; and from 1997 to 2002, he was its Deputy Chairperson. His candidacy for that position  was supported by the Bulgarian Socialist Party (BSP), the successor to the Bulgarian Communist Party (BCP).  Although never a member of the BCP, Sendov had close ties to former Bulgarian communist dictator Todor Zhivkov.

The rightist Union of the Democratic Forces removed him temporarily from that duty in 2000 when Sendov cosigned, together with four members of the BSP, a letter to the Israeli president asking that portraits of the Bulgarian Royal Family (from the 1940s) be removed from a memorial in Israel. This memorial commemorates that all Bulgarian Jews were saved from deportation to concentration camps during World War II.

Bulgaria ambassador to Japan
Sendov was Bulgarian ambassador to Japan from 2004 to 2009.

Sendov's conjecture
Sendov's name is attached to one of the major unsolved problems in the study of polynomial zeros, Sendov's conjecture (sometimes incorrectly known as Ilieff's conjecture).

Serbian Academy of Sciences and Arts
In 2000 he was elected as a member of Serbian Academy of Sciences and Arts, an academic institution located in Belgrade, Serbia.

References

Books

External links

Staff writer (12 December 2007).  "Curriculum Vitae of Blagovest Sendov" (Sendov's personal page as a mathematician).  Institute for Parallel Processing's module at the Bulgarian Academy of Sciences.  Accessed 21 January 2011.
 

1932 births
Chairpersons of the National Assembly of Bulgaria
20th-century Bulgarian  mathematicians

21st-century Bulgarian  mathematicians
Ambassadors of Bulgaria to Japan
2020 deaths
Members of the Bulgarian Academy of Sciences
Members of the National Assembly (Bulgaria)
Members of the Serbian Academy of Sciences and Arts
People from Asenovgrad
Academic staff of Sofia University
Rectors of Sofia University
Foreign members of the Serbian Academy of Sciences and Arts